Olga Olegovna Lomonosova (born 18 May 1978) is a Russian actress and former ballerina. She is best known for her roles as Kira Voropayeva in the television series Not Born Beautiful and Alla Safranov in the Netflix series Better than Us.

Early life 
Olga Lomonosova was born in Donetsk, Ukraine, to mother Natalia Evgenyevna Lomonosova, an economist, and her dad a builder. As a child, she participated in rhythmic gymnastics. In 1986, the Lomonosova family moved to Kiev, where Olga was admitted to the School of The Olympic Reserve of Albina Deriugina, achieving candidacy for master of sports. At the age of 12, Lomonosova entered the Kiev Choreographic School to study ballet.

In 1997, Lomonosova moved to Moscowand enrolled in the Stanislavski and Nemirovich-Danchenko Theatre as a ballet dancer. She studied under Rodion Ovchinnikov at the Boris Shchukin Theatre Institute, and successfully graduated in 2003.

Roles in the theatre 
"Beautiful People" (the prom performance; directed by Pavel Safonov)- Natalia Petrovna at the Boris Shchukin Theatre Institute.

2003 - Lear (based on King Lear by William Shakespeare; directed by Vladimir Mirzoyev) – Cordelia; Don Juan and Sganarel, Caligula, at the E. B. Vakhtangov Theatre. 

A Midsummer Night's Dream - Hermia at the Moscow Drama Theatre named after K. S. Stanislavsky. Pygmalion (Entreprise Performance: Theatre Marathon Project) - Eliza Doolittle at the Theatre Agency "Premiere"

At other Theatres: "Duck Hunt" – Galina, 2014 - "Tartuf" - Elmira, Wife of Orgon, "Valentine's Day" – Valentina, 2015 - "Male fragrance. Orchestra" – Suzanne, 2018 -"The Eldest Son" by A. Vampilova - Nina, daughter of Sarafanov and 2018 -Platonov».

TV and film
Lomonosova's first major role on television was as Ekaterina Vosnesenskaya in the 2003 television series Kobra. Antiterror. Her breakthrough role was playing Kira Voropayeva in the 2005 television series Not Born Beautiful.

In 2012, she played the lead role in the film Masha.  In 2018, she appeared in the film Secrets and Lies.

In 2019, she played Alla Safranov, estranged wife of Georgy Safronov, in the Netflix original series Better than Us.

Filmography

References

External links
 
 

1978 births
Living people
People from Donetsk
21st-century Russian actresses
Russian film actresses
Russian television actresses
Russian stage actresses
Russian ballerinas